The Culver Aircraft Company was an American aircraft manufacturer of light aircraft of the 1930s and 1940s.

History
The Dart Manufacturing Corporation was founded in Columbus, Ohio, by Monocoupe dealer Knight K. Culver and Al Mooney to purchase the rights to the Mooney-designed Monosport G from the defunct Lambert Aircraft Corporation. The company was renamed the Culver Aircraft Company in 1939. In December 1939, Culver produced the Culver Model L, later renaming it Cadet.  Production was supervised by Al's brother, Art Mooney.

Having moved from Columbus to Wichita, Kansas, after producing 50 aircraft, two retractable-gear models, the LFA and LCA, were introduced, and in 1941 the company was taken over by Walter Beech (founder of Beechcraft) and Charles Yankey. The company switched to subcontract work during World War II. Culver produced a radio-controlled pilotless aircraft based on the LFA for use as target drones. Over 3000 PQ-8/TDC and PQ-14/TD2C gunnery target drones were produced for the USAAF and USN.

T. Bowring Woodbury was promoted to president in 1945. That same year, Culver developed the Model V. The V, also known as the M-17, featured a patented flight control system, known as Simpli-Fly Control, which automated a number of flight functions; the system was looked down upon by pilots, and the Model V was not considered a success. The Model V was developed into the XPQ-15 drone, but did not win production orders; not very long after the end of World War II, Culver Aircraft entered bankruptcy, the Mooney brothers departing to form the Mooney Aircraft Company and the manufacturing plant was purchased by the Coleman Company. In 1956, the Superior Aircraft Company was established, purchasing the assets of the Culver Aircraft Company, and put the Model V back into production as the Superior Satellite.

Aircraft

References

External links

 "Culver Model V", August 1946, Popular Science — with large "pull out" color photo.

Defunct aircraft manufacturers of the United States
American companies established in 1939
Vehicle manufacturing companies established in 1939
Manufacturing companies disestablished in 1946
1939 establishments in Ohio
1946 disestablishments in Kansas
 
Defunct manufacturing companies based in Kansas
Defunct manufacturing companies based in Ohio